The 2011 Spanish general election was held on Sunday, 20 November 2011, to elect the 10th Cortes Generales of the Kingdom of Spain. All 350 seats in the Congress of Deputies were up for election, as well as 208 of 266 seats in the Senate. An election had not been due until April 2012 at latest, but a call by Prime Minister José Luis Rodríguez Zapatero for a snap election five months ahead of schedule was announced on 29 July 2011. Zapatero would not be seeking a third term in office, and with political pressure mounting, a deteriorating economic situation and his political project exhausted, an early election was perceived as the only way out.

The election campaign was dominated by the effects of an ongoing financial crisis, high unemployment, a large public deficit and a soaring risk premium. Opinion polls had shown consistent leads for the opposition People's Party (PP) over the ruling Spanish Socialist Workers' Party (PSOE), whose popularity had plummeted after Zapatero's U-turns in economic policy had forced him to adopt tough spending cuts and austerity measures. Massive anti-austerity protests had taken place in May 2011 under the form of the 15-M Movement, and in the local and regional elections held a few days later popular support for the PSOE fell dramatically. On 21 October, the armed organization ETA announced a permanent cessation of armed activity, turning the 2011 election into the first since the Spanish transition to democracy without ETA attacks.

The election resulted in the PSOE being swept out from power in the worst defeat for a sitting government in Spain up until that time since 1982, losing 4.3 million votes and scoring its worst result in a general election ever since the first democratic election in 1977. In contrast, PP's Mariano Rajoy won a record absolute majority in a landslide, being his party's best historic result as well as the second largest and, to date, last majority in Spanish democracy. Also for the first time in a general election, the PSOE failed to come out on top in both Andalusia and Catalonia, with the nationalist Convergence and Union (CiU) emerging victorious in the later, whereas the abertzale left Amaiur achieved a major breakthrough in both the Basque Country and Navarre. United Left (IU) experienced a turnaround of its electoral fortunes and saw its first remarkable increase in 15 years, whereas centrist Union, Progress and Democracy (UPyD) exceeded all expectations with over one million votes, 5 seats and just 0.3% short of the 5% threshold required for being recognized a party parliamentary group in Congress.

Overview

Electoral system
The Spanish Cortes Generales were envisaged as an imperfect bicameral system. The Congress of Deputies had greater legislative power than the Senate, having the ability to vote confidence in or withdraw it from a prime minister and to override Senate vetoes by an absolute majority of votes. Nonetheless, the Senate possessed a few exclusive (yet limited in number) functions—such as its role in constitutional amendment—which were not subject to the Congress' override. Voting for the Cortes Generales was on the basis of universal suffrage, which comprised all nationals over 18 years of age and in full enjoyment of their political rights. Amendments to the electoral law in 2011 required for Spaniards abroad to apply for voting before being permitted to vote, a system known as "begged" or expat vote.

For the Congress of Deputies, 348 seats were elected using the D'Hondt method and a closed list proportional representation, with an electoral threshold of three percent of valid votes—which included blank ballots—being applied in each constituency. Seats were allocated to constituencies, corresponding to the provinces of Spain, with each being allocated an initial minimum of two seats and the remaining 248 being distributed in proportion to their populations. Ceuta and Melilla were allocated the two remaining seats, which were elected using plurality voting. The use of the D'Hondt method might result in a higher effective threshold, depending on the district magnitude.

As a result of the aforementioned allocation, each Congress multi-member constituency was entitled the following seats:

For the Senate, 208 seats were elected using an open list partial block voting system, with electors voting for individual candidates instead of parties. In constituencies electing four seats, electors could vote for up to three candidates; in those with two or three seats, for up to two candidates; and for one candidate in single-member districts. Each of the 47 peninsular provinces was allocated four seats, whereas for insular provinces, such as the Balearic and Canary Islands, districts were the islands themselves, with the larger—Majorca, Gran Canaria and Tenerife—being allocated three seats each, and the smaller—Menorca, Ibiza–Formentera, Fuerteventura, La Gomera, El Hierro, Lanzarote and La Palma—one each. Ceuta and Melilla elected two seats each. Additionally, autonomous communities could appoint at least one senator each and were entitled to one additional senator per each million inhabitants.

Election date
The term of each chamber of the Cortes Generales—the Congress and the Senate—expired four years from the date of their previous election, unless they were dissolved earlier. The election decree was required to be issued no later than the twenty-fifth day prior to the date of expiry of the Cortes in the event that the prime minister did not make use of his prerogative of early dissolution. The decree was to be published on the following day in the Official State Gazette (BOE), with election day taking place on the fifty-fourth day from publication. The previous election was held on 9 March 2008, which meant that the legislature's term would expire on 9 March 2012. The election decree was required to be published in the BOE no later than 14 February 2012, with the election taking place on the fifty-fourth day from publication, setting the latest possible election date for the Cortes Generales on Sunday, 8 April 2012.

The prime minister had the prerogative to dissolve both chambers at any given time—either jointly or separately—and call a snap election, provided that no motion of no confidence was in process, no state of emergency was in force and that dissolution did not occur before one year had elapsed since the previous one. Additionally, both chambers were to be dissolved and a new election called if an investiture process failed to elect a prime minister within a two-month period from the first ballot. Barred this exception, there was no constitutional requirement for simultaneous elections for the Congress and the Senate. Still, as of  there has been no precedent of separate elections taking place under the 1978 Constitution.

Background
The 2008 general election had resulted in a victory for the Spanish Socialist Workers' Party (PSOE) of José Luis Rodríguez Zapatero, which nonetheless fell 7 seats short of an absolute majority. The Socialists had been re-elected on a full employment platform, despite the Spanish economy showing signs of fatigue and economic slowdown after a decade of growth. As a result, Zapatero was sworn in as prime minister for a second term in office in April 2008. Zapatero's second term would be dominated by the 2008–11 economic and financial crisis.

The effects of the economic crisis in Spain started to become apparent at the beginning of Zapatero's second term. The first measure adopted by the newly elected government to mitigate the economic slowdown was an injection of €10 billion into the Spanish economy, of which €6 billion were to fulfill a €400 tax reduction as part of the PSOE 2008 election pledges. Over the next months the government was forced to lower its economic growth forecast for 2008 from 3.1% to 2.3%, then to 1.6%. The government also had to cope with a transport strike on 9–15 June, motivated by a rapid increase in oil prices. Zapatero initially refused to publicly acknowledge the existence of the economic crisis, to which he referred as "intense temporary slowdown" or "economic weaknesses". On 23 June 2008, Zapatero's cabinet adopted an "austerity plan" intended to save €250 million—consisting of a 70% reduction in the public job offer and a salary freeze for senior public servants—as well as financial stimulus measures—injection of €35 billion to SMEs and €2.5 billion annually until 2010 to improve the efficiency in the hotel sector—in order to soften the impact of job losses and rising oil prices, with Zapatero finally acknowledging the crisis during an interview on 8 July. Meanwhile, Martinsa-Fadesa bankruptcy filling in July 2008 as a result of the Spanish property bubble bursting turned into Spain's biggest ever corporate default.

Job destruction in Spain became increasingly noticeable: by August 2008 2.5 million were already unemployed, the highest figure in 10 years. By December 2008, Spain would become the country with the highest job destruction rate in the world, with unemployment nearing 3 million. In October 2008, the government announced a €100 billion guarantee for bank debts and the creation of a €30 billion worth fund—extendable to €50 billion—to purchase 'healthy' assets from banks and savings banks "to ensure the Spanish market liquidity". From November 2008 to January 2009, the government proposed a €50 billion stimulus plan—with €8 billion destined to public investment in municipalities—expected to create 300,000 jobs throughout 2009, which was later criticised for its spending unsustainability and for creating "unproductive" jobs. In Q4 2008 the Spanish economy officially went into recession after a GDP fall of 1.1%—having already fallen by 0.3% on Q3 2008—putting an end to 15 years of uninterrupted economic growth.

On 28 March 2009, the Spanish government launched a €9 billion bailout to rescue Caja Castilla La Mancha, the first Spanish savings bank to be intervened during the crisis, to be followed by CajaSur in 2010, the nationalization of CAM, Unnim, CatalunyaCaixa and Novagalicia Banco in 2011 and the intervention and nationalization of Banco de Valencia in 2011–12. As part of the bank restructuring, the FROB was created in June 2009 to preside over the mergers and acquisitions of the failing savings banks. In April 2009, Pedro Solbes was replaced as Spain's Economy and Finance minister by the low-profile Elena Salgado as part of a major cabinet reshuffle, in a move seen as Zapatero seeking to take more direct control of economic policy himself.

By Q2 2009, unemployment had grown to 17.9%—more than 4 million unemployed—and the GDP had fallen by 4.2%. This prompted Zapatero to announce on 28 August 2009 that the 2010 budget would include a "limited and temporary" tax increase worth €16 billion—dubbed by many as the largest tax rise in history—to tackle the revenue fall and spending increase resulting from the crisis. Further measures, such as the suppression of the €400 tax reduction and a VAT increase from 16% to 18%—in its standard rate—and from 7% to 8%—in its reduced rate—were announced in the following weeks. The end of 2009 would see unemployment climbing to 18.8%, with public deficit soaring—11.4% of GDP—and forcing the government to approve on 29 January 2010 a €50 billion worth-savings plan for the 2010–13 period, cutting all public spending except for social benefits, welfare state policies and those involving a production model renewal.

However, despite the government's efforts, the economic situation kept worsening. On 5 February, Spain's risk premium reached the 100 basis point-mark in a black week for Madrid Stock Exchange—with the IBEX 35 falling by 9.3%. By early May 2010, unemployment had reached the 20% mark for the first time since the 1993 economic crisis, while the crisis in Greece, threatening to engulf the remained of the eurozone, caused the risk premium to rise dramatically by 60% to 170 basis points and the Madrid Stock Exchange to fall by 10%. As a result, Zapatero announced a €15 billion austerity package on 12 May aimed at preventing the country's default. Among the adopted measures were a cut of 5% in public wages, a pension freezing for 2011, cuts into dependency spending and the removal of the €2,500 birth allowance, among others. Zapatero's U-turn, breaching a previous pledge not to cut social spending, caused his and the PSOE's popularity ratings to plummet in opinion polls.

On 9 September 2010, the PSOE government approved a labor reform, which included suspension of collective agreements during economic downturns, a lower redundancy pay in cases of wrongful dismissal—from 45 to 33 days per year worked—or cheaper dismissals for companies facing losses, among others. The reform, coupled with the cut in public wages and the pension freeze, provoked the Socialist government to face its first general strike on 29 September. In order to tackle dropping poll numbers, a major cabinet reshuffle took place on 20 October, resulting in a number of ministries being disbanded and María Teresa Fernández de la Vega, who had served as Zapatero's deputy for most of his tenure, being replaced by interior minister Alfredo Pérez Rubalcaba. The risk premium kept growing and peaked at 270 basis points by the end of November. Zapatero's government announced a new austerity package on 1 December—including the removal of a €426 allowance for long-term unemployed and the privatizations of AENA and the Lotteries—but also a tax cut for SMEs. In the following weeks, Zapatero would also announce an increase of the retirement age from 65 to 67 to be applied "flexibly and progressively" until 2027.

Parliamentary composition
The Cortes Generales were officially dissolved on 27 September 2011, after the publication of the dissolution decree in the Official State Gazette. The tables below show the composition of the parliamentary groups in both chambers at the time of dissolution.

Parties and candidates
The electoral law allowed for parties and federations registered in the interior ministry, coalitions and groupings of electors to present lists of candidates. Parties and federations intending to form a coalition ahead of an election were required to inform the relevant Electoral Commission within ten days of the election call, whereas groupings of electors needed to secure the signature of at least one percent of the electorate in the constituencies for which they sought election, disallowing electors from signing for more than one list of candidates. Concurrently, parties, federations or coalitions that had not obtained a mandate in either chamber of the Cortes at the preceding election were required to secure the signature of at least 0.1 percent of electors in the aforementioned constituencies.

Below is a list of the main parties and electoral alliances which contested the election:

The Socialists' Party of Catalonia (PSC), Initiative for Catalonia Greens (ICV) and United and Alternative Left (EUiA) continued their Catalan Senate alliance without ERC, under the Agreement for Catalonia Progress name. Concurrently, the new green Equo party allied itself with PSM–Nationalist Agreement (PSM–EN), Initiative Greens (IV) and Agreement for Majorca (ExM) in the Balearic Islands and with Sí Se Puede (SSP) and Socialists for Tenerife (SxTf) in the Santa Cruz de Tenerife constituency.

Timetable
The key dates are listed below (all times are CET. Note that the Canary Islands use WET (UTC+0) instead):

26 September: The election decree is issued with the countersign of the Prime Minister after deliberation in the Council of Ministers, ratified by the King.
27 September: Formal dissolution of the Cortes Generales and official start of ban period for the organization of events for the inauguration of public works, services or projects.
30 September: Initial constitution of provincial and zone electoral commissions.
7 October: Deadline for parties and federations intending to enter in coalition to inform the relevant electoral commission.
17 October: Deadline for parties, federations, coalitions and groupings of electors to present lists of candidates to the relevant electoral commission.
19 October: Submitted lists of candidates are provisionally published in the Official State Gazette (BOE).
22 October: Deadline for citizens entered in the Register of Absent Electors Residing Abroad (CERA) and for citizens temporarily absent from Spain to apply for voting.
23 October: Deadline for parties, federations, coalitions and groupings of electors to rectify irregularities in their lists.
24 October: Official proclamation of valid submitted lists of candidates.
25 October: Proclaimed lists are published in the BOE.
4 November: Official start of electoral campaigning.
10 November: Deadline to apply for postal voting.
15 November: Official start of legal ban on electoral opinion polling publication, dissemination or reproduction and deadline for CERA citizens to vote by mail.
16 November: Deadline for postal and temporarily absent voters to issue their votes.
18 November: Last day of official electoral campaigning and deadline for CERA citizens to vote in a ballot box in the relevant consular office or division.
19 November: Official 24-hour ban on political campaigning prior to the general election (reflection day).
20 November: Polling day (polling stations open at 9 am and close at 8 pm or once voters present in a queue at/outside the polling station at 8 pm have cast their vote). Counting of votes starts immediately.
23 November: General counting of votes, including the counting of CERA votes.
26 November: Deadline for the general counting of votes to be carried out by the relevant electoral commission.
5 December: Deadline for elected members to be proclaimed by the relevant electoral commission.
15 December: Deadline for both chambers of the Cortes Generales to be re-assembled (the election decree determines this date, which for the 2011 election was set for 13 December).
14 January: Maximum deadline for definitive results to be published in the BOE.

Campaign

Party slogans

Election debates

Opinion polls

Opinion polls

Results

Congress of Deputies

Senate

Outcome
With an overall voter turnout of 68.9%—the lowest in a decade—the Spanish Socialist Workers' Party (PSOE) suffered its worst ever defeat in a general election, while also scoring one of the worst electoral performances for a ruling party in Spain since the UCD collapse in the 1982 election. The People's Party (PP) was able to win an historic absolute majority with 186 out of 350 seats—the largest obtained by a party since 1982—after almost eight years in opposition. The PSOE went on to finish below first place in all but two provinces—Barcelona and Seville—while also losing both Andalusia and Catalonia, which up to that point had been carried by the PSOE in every general election. The 2011 Spanish election marked the continuation of a string of severe government election losses across European countries since the start of the 2007–08 financial crisis, including Iceland, Greece, Hungary, the United Kingdom, Ireland or Portugal.

Minoritary national parties, such as United Left (IU) and Union, Progress and Democracy (UPyD), benefitted greatly from the PSOE collapse, winning 11 and 5 seats respectively—2 and 1 in the previous parliament. This was the first time since the 1989 election than more than one of the smaller nationwide-contesting parties obtained more than 1 million votes in a general election, as well as enough seats to form parliamentary groups on their own right. The PSOE collapse also resulted in nearly all parties winning parliamentary presence in the Congress of Deputies increasing their vote shares—only Republican Left of Catalonia (ERC) and Geroa Bai (GBai) lost votes compared to 2008. The Basque Nationalist Party (PNV) lost 1 seat despite scoring higher than in 2008, but this came as a result of Amaiur's irruption, with 6 out of its 7 seats being elected in the Basque Country.

Convergence and Union (CiU), the party federation formed by Democratic Convergence of Catalonia (CDC) and Democratic Union of Catalonia (UDC), was elected to an historic general election victory in the region of Catalonia. The Socialists' Party of Catalonia (PSC), PSOE's sister party in the region—which had, up until that point, been the first Catalan political force in every general election held since 1977—scored a poor showing by finishing in second place with 27% of the vote. The 2011 election would be the last time both parties would dominate the Catalan political landscape in a general election; the next election, held on 20 December 2015, would see the alliance between CDC and UDC broken and the PSC being crushed to third place regionally by both the En Comú Podem alliance and ERC.

In terms of vote share, PSOE's electoral result, with 28.76%, would remain the worst electoral performance for a sitting Spanish government in a nationwide-held election since 1982 until the 2014 European Parliament election held two and a half years later, when the PP obtained 26.09% of the share, and in a general election until 2015—the PP obtaining 28.71%.

Aftermath

Notes

References

External links

General
2011 in Spain
2011
November 2011 events in Europe